QIAGEN N.V., the global corporate headquarter of the QIAGEN group, is located in Venlo, The Netherlands. Furthermore, European, American, and Asian regional headquarters are located in respectively Hilden, Germany, Maryland United States, and Shanghai, China. QIAGEN is a provider of sample and assay technologies for molecular diagnostics, applied testing, academic and pharmaceutical research. The company operates in more than 35 offices in over 25 countries. QIAGEN's shares are listed at the NYSE (using ticker QGEN) and at the Frankfurt Stock Exchange in the Prime Standard (using ticker QIA). Thierry Bernard is the company's Chief Executive Officer(CEO). The main operative headquarters are located in Hilden, Germany.

History 

In 1984,  QIAGEN was established on November 29, by a team of scientists at the Heinrich Heine University Düsseldorf, Germany. Two years later, QIAGEN launched its first product. A kit for the purification of plasmids – small ring-shaped DNA molecules in bacterial cells – cutting the preparation time for plasmids from between two and three days down to two hours. 1996 saw the initial public offering of QIAGEN on the technology-oriented Nasdaq stock exchange, becoming the first German company to do so. 1997 saw the initial public offering on the Frankfurt Stock Exchange in Germany.

Acquisitions

In 2004, QIAGEN acquired key assets of Molecular Staging, Inc. Two years later, QIAGEN established its Asia regional headquarters in Shanghai. In 2007 sales reached US$649.8 million and the number of employees surpassed 2,600. QIAGEN acquired Digene (which is a quick relief from problems related to acidity, acid reflux, indigestion, stomach gas) for US$1.6 billion, furthering QIAGEN in molecular diagnostics by revenue and diagnostics for disease prevention.

In 2009, QIAGEN began building its Personalized Healthcare business through the acquisition of DxS Ltd, in a deal valued at US$95 million and it acquired SABiosciences Corp. in a deal valued at US$90 million.  At the end of 2009 QIAGEN surpassed the US$1 billion revenue mark and had over 3,500 employees. QIAGEN became one of the first companies to release a clinically verified diagnostic test for the detection of H1N1, more commonly known as Swine Flu.

In 2010, QIAGEN acquired ESE GmbH, giving the company access to point of need testing devices for the application of molecular diagnostic tests without laboratory infrastructure. QIAGEN launched the QIAsymphony AS and QIAsymphony RGQ platforms, adding to the company's portfolio for laboratory workflow automation and molecular test full-process automation respectively.  QIAsymphony DSP Virus/Pathogen Kits enable sensitive detection of a broad range of DNA and RNA viruses, as well as bacterial DNA

In 2011, QIAGEN acquired Ipsogen S.A. for US$101 million, adding to the company's product and IP portfolio in the blood cancer space and developing its position in molecular diagnostics for oncology. QIAGEN also acquired Cellestis Limited for US$374 million, giving the company access to QuantiFERON technology for disease detection and prevention. The company added two new offices in the Asia Pacific region in New Delhi, India and Taipei, Taiwan. The company announced a comprehensive restructuring program to focus on high-growth areas such as personalized medicine and business in emerging markets. The program includes workforce reduction and internal restructuring affecting approximately 10% of the company's 3,900 positions.

In 2013, QIAGEN acquired Ingenuity Systems. QIAGEN also acquired CLC bio, which offers bioinformatics analysis software. In 2015, QIAGEN acquired AdnaGen's circulating tumor cell enrichment technology. QIAGEN also acquired Enzymatic enzyme solutions.

In March 2015, a management buyout of QIAGEN Marseille led to the creation of HalioDx. In late 2015 the GeneReader NGS System was launched, and the acquisition of Mo Bio Laboratories was completed.

In 2016, QIAGEN acquired the Danish molecular diagnostics company Exiqon.

In 2017, QIAGEN acquired OmicSoft Corporation, a leading provider of highly curated public datasets.

In 2018, QIAGEN transferred its listing to New York Stock Exchange. In April 2018, QIAGEN acquired the Spanish firm STAT-Dx and launched the QIAstat-Dx molecular diagnostics platform.

In 2019, QIAGEN announced the acquisition of Formulatrix assets to develop a digital PCR platform. An additional acquisition of N-of-One, a privately held U.S. molecular decision support company and pioneer in clinical interpretation services for complex genomic data, to expand its QCI bioinformatics offerings with Real World Insights. In October 2019 QIAGEN entered into an agreement with Illumina granting QIAGEN non-exclusive rights to develop and globally commercialize IVD kits to be used together with Illumina's diagnostic instruments.

In September 2020 QIAGEN announced the acquisition of Michigan-based NeuMoDx Inc. to market two fully integrated systems for automated PCR.

In January 2023, the business announced its intention to acquire Verogen for $150 million.

Qiagen 
Molecular Staging, Inc. (Acq 2004)
Digene (Acq 2007)
Corbett Life Science (Acq 2008)
DxS Ltd (Acq 2009)
SABiosciences Corp. (Acq 2009)
ESE GmbH (Acq 2010)
Ipsogen S.A. (Acq 2011)
Cellestis Limited (Acq 2011)
Ingenuity Systems (Acq 2013)
CLC bio (Acq 2013)
Exiqon (Acq 2016)
STAT-Dx (Acq 2018)
Formulatrix (Acq 2019)
OmicSoft (Acq 2017)
N-of-One (Acq 2019)
Molecular Staging, Inc. (Acq 2020)
NeuMoDx Molecular Inc (Acq 2020)
Verogen (Acq 2023)

2020 Thermo Fisher Acquisition Target 

On March 3, 2020, Thermo Fisher Scientific announced plans for the acquisition of QIAGEN at €39 per share in cash, which valued the transaction at $11.5 billion at the time.

The day after an open letter by hedge fund Davidson Kempner Capital Management, one of QIAGEN's largest shareholders, to reject the bid as undervalued, Thermo Fisher raised their tender by 10% to €43 per share, an advance of $1B in value. Davidson Kempner subsequently increased their holdings from 5.1% to 7.3% of QIAGEN.

The acquisition offer was terminated on August 13, 2020 having only reached the threshold of 47% of shareholder approval, below the minimum 66.6% required as per the agreement. Davidson Kempner was notable as having continued to reject the bid. Because of the lapsed offer, QIAGEN was required to reimburse $95 Million to Thermo Fisher in expenses. Within a week of the collapse of the merger, QIAGEN's stock rose over 10%.

On August 21, the chairman of the company's supervisory board, Håkan Björklund, stepped down to be immediately replaced by Lawrence Rosen.

Resulting from the failed takeover bid, QIAGEN announced it would buy the outstanding 80.1% of shares in NeuMoDx Molecular Inc,which it did not already own for about $234 million.

COVID-19 
Since early 2020, QIAGEN worked closely with governments, public health authorities, and customers worldwide to ensure the availability of critical COVID-19 testing diagnostics, covering the needs of clinical and research customers. The tests and kits cover manual to automated sample processing, low to high throughput, single-plex to multi-plex, and from active infection testing to detecting previous viral exposure.

In September 2021, QIAGEN entered the DAX (Deutscher Aktienindex)  – Germany’s leading stock market index.

In May 2022, QIAGEN strengthened its sample technologies business and acquired the majority stake in enzymes provider BLIRT S.A.

Products 

QIAGEN is a worldwide provider of molecular sample insights. Sample technologies are used to collect samples of tissue, fluids, etc. and stabilize, extract and purify various molecules of interest such as DNA, RNA or proteins from other cellular components. Assay technologies are then used to amplify (multiply) and enrich this small amount of isolated material to make it visible, readable and ready for interpretation. The separation and purification of genetic information is a basic precondition for further application or analysis.

QIAGEN provides molecular technologies offered as kits with open or specific target analytes. According to QIAGEN, the company's current portfolio covers more than 500 products and more than 2,000 patents and licenses.

Application areas 
Until the mid-2000s, QIAGEN was mainly a provider of sample technologies for the academic research market. QIAGEN's current product portfolio includes sample and assay technologies, specific automation solutions, and a bioinformatics analysis portfolio in 4 markets.

Molecular diagnostics 
Molecular diagnostics detect the nucleic acids (DNA and RNA) of target diseases or pathogens in samples such as blood or tissue. These procedures can help to detect viruses and bacteria more rapidly and with greater sensitivity and specificity than other methods such as bacterial culture or immunodiagnostics. Molecular diagnostics are also used to analyze individual patients' genomic information to further classify certain diseases and to determine the most appropriate treatment. QIAGEN's portfolio in molecular diagnostics covers various applications which the company divides into three main segments:

• Oncology: The company's portfolio in oncology includes tests for a broad range of clinically relevant biomarkers, particularly in cancer, encompassing companion diagnostics that are marketed in combination with certain drugs, helping to guide treatment decisions. In addition, QIAGEN markets a range of gene panels for research applications in next-generation sequencing, covering dozens of genes associated with various cancers. Furthermore, the company offers technologies for the extraction and enrichment of molecular biomarkers from body fluids, supporting the development of liquid biopsies. Minimally invasive liquid biopsies hold promise to transform the diagnosis and treatment of cancer.

• Modulation of Immune Response: The QuantiFERON-TB Gold In-Tube Test (QFT) is regarded worldwide as the modern standard for the detection of latent tuberculosis infection. According to WHO estimates, this condition affects about one-third of the world's population. As up to 10% of people with latent TB infection will develop the active disease in the course of their lives, the identification and treatment of at-risk groups with latent TB are important for sustainable control of this potentially life-threatening infectious disease.

• Infectious Diseases: QIAGEN offers several comprehensive test panels for detection of bacterial and viral pathogens. The portfolio encompasses assays for the detection of individual pathogens such as Influenza, HIV, Hepatitis, and healthcare-associated infections. The company also has a global leadership position in screening for high-risk types of human papillomavirus (HPV), the primary cause of cervical cancer.

Applied testing 
QIAGEN's portfolio includes:

Forensics: tests used to identify victims, prosecute criminals and determine paternity or lineage.

Academic research 
The life science research market encompasses all disciplines focusing on living organisms such as humans, animals, plants or bacteria (e.g., biochemistry, biomedicine or genetic engineering). Much of the research is done on a molecular level targeting DNA, RNA and proteins and helps scientists to comprehend basic processes in cells and organisms.

QIAGEN introduced the first kit for purification of plasmids – small ring-shaped DNA molecules in bacterial cells – in 1986, cutting the preparation time for plasmids from between two and three days down to two hours. The company has a global market share exceeding 70% for certain sample preparation technologies.

Pharmaceutical industry 
QIAGEN is targeting market segments with promising growth opportunities. At the core of this strategy is a focus on five pillars of growth which are built on the company’s leadership in sample technologies, the first step in any laboratory process. The pillars furthermore include the QuantiFERON franchise with its leading test for the detection of latent TB infection, the syndromic testing solution QIAstat-DX for the detection of multiple pathogens in a single run, and the high-throughput PCR-testing platform NeuMoDx, as well as the digital PCR testing technology QIAcuity.

Multinational pharmaceutical companies use molecular sample and assay technologies in all phases of the drug development process, from the fundamental pharmaceutical research stage, through preclinical and clinical studies, to the commercialization and application of new products.

QIAGEN technologies can be used to identify genes that participate in the emergence of diseases, carry out studies on the functions and interactions between genes (or proteins) in entire biological pathways, identify and validate potential biomarkers and identify and evaluate therapeutic target molecules and suitable active agent candidates. QIAGEN's products can also be used in the execution of the clinical studies.

Management 
The company's Executive Committee currently consists of the following members:
Thierry Bernard (Chief Executive Officer)
Roland Sackers (Chief Financial Officer)
Stephany Foster (Senior Vice President, Head of Human Resources)
Antonio Santos (Senior Vice President Global Operations)
Thomas Schweins (Senior Vice President Life Science Business Area)
Jonathan Sheldon (Senior Vice President, QIAGEN Digital Insights Business Area)
Jean-Pascal Viola (Senior Vice President Corporate Business Development)

Structure of the company 
QIAGEN has a holding structure. The holding (QIAGEN N.V.) is located in Venlo, The Netherlands. The operative and European headquarters are located in Hilden, Germany. Furthermore American headquarters are located in Maryland United States and for Asia in Shanghai, China.

References

Medical software
Research support companies
Companies based in North Rhine-Westphalia
Biotechnology companies of Germany
German companies established in 1984
Biotechnology companies established in 1984
Companies listed on the New York Stock Exchange
Companies listed on the Frankfurt Stock Exchange
German brands
Companies in the TecDAX
Companies in the MDAX